Risto Lakić (Cyrillic: Ристо Лакић; born 3 July 1983) is a Montenegrin retired professional footballer who played as a right back.

Club career
Lakić made his first football steps at Iskra Danilovgrad, before joining the youth ranks of Budućnost Podgorica. He was a member of the team that won promotion to the First League of Serbia and Montenegro, together with Nikola Vujović, Milan Purović and Igor Burzanović, among others. In the following two seasons (2004–2006), Lakić played regularly for his club, becoming one of the most promising defenders in the country.

In January 2008, Lakić was transferred to Partizan, signing a two-year contract, with an option for a third year. He rejoined his teammate Mladen Božović, who moved in the same direction earlier that month. However, Lakić made only two competitive appearances for Partizan, as they won the double, before leaving the club in the 2008 summer transfer window. He subsequently moved to Vojvodina, recording only 13 league appearances in the next two years (2008–2010).

In June 2011, Lakić returned to his homeland and joined Mogren. He again moved to Serbia and signed with Čukarički in the summer of 2012. After another year without competitive football, Lakić signed with Mladost Podgorica in January 2014.

International career
Lakić represented Serbia and Montenegro at under-21 level. He then played for Montenegro at full international level, making his debut in his country's first ever competitive match on 24 March 2007, a friendly against Hungary in Podgorica. He has earned a total of 7 caps, scoring no goals. His final international was a March 2008 friendly against Norway.

Honours
Budućnost Podgorica
 Second League of Serbia and Montenegro: 2003–04
Partizan
 Serbian SuperLiga: 2007–08
 Serbian Cup: 2007–08

Notes

References

External links
 
 

1983 births
Living people
Footballers from Podgorica
Association football fullbacks
Serbia and Montenegro footballers
Serbia and Montenegro under-21 international footballers
Montenegrin footballers
Montenegro international footballers
FK Budućnost Podgorica players
FK Partizan players
FK Vojvodina players
FK Mogren players
FK Čukarički players
OFK Titograd players
Second League of Serbia and Montenegro players
First League of Serbia and Montenegro players
Montenegrin First League players
Serbian SuperLiga players
Montenegrin expatriate footballers
Expatriate footballers in Serbia
Montenegrin expatriate sportspeople in Serbia